A tackler was a supervisor in a textile factory responsible for the working of a number of power looms and the weavers who operated them. The title derived from the job, which was to "tackle" any mechanical problems encountered with the looms in their charge. Invariably male, they had a reputation for gullibility and were the butt of many jokes.

References
Notes

Bibliography

Further reading

Weaving
Articles containing video clips